Gary Burns may refer to:
 Gary Burns (director) (born 1960), Canadian film writer and director
 Gary Burns (ice hockey) (born 1955), former American ice hockey forward
 Gary Burns, former commissioner of South Australia Police